Orfi (also Romanized as ‘Orfī; also known as ‘Alafī and Arfī) is a village in Sarjam Rural District, Ahmadabad District, Mashhad County, Razavi Khorasan Province, Iran. At the 2006 census, its population was 381, in 99 families.

References 

Populated places in Mashhad County